Miguel Luís Pinto Veloso (born 11 May 1986) is a Portuguese professional footballer who plays for and captains Italian club Hellas Verona. Mainly a defensive midfielder, he can also operate as an attacking left-back.

He started his career with Sporting CP, for whom he appeared in 156 games in all competitions, and also spent two years with Genoa before joining Dynamo Kyiv in 2012. After winning four domestic honours in Ukraine, he returned to Genoa in 2016.

A full international since 2007, Veloso earned 56 caps for Portugal, appearing at two World Cups and as many European Championships.

Club career

Sporting CP
Born in Coimbra, Veloso started his football career at S.L. Benfica, but was rejected for being slightly overweight at the time, entering Lisbon neighbours Sporting CP's youth system at the age of 14. There, he was promoted to the first team for the 2004–05 pre-season, which took place mainly in England; he started out as a central defender.

In order to receive more playing time, Veloso was loaned to C.D. Olivais e Moscavide in the third division, and he helped them promote to the Segunda Liga with a career-best seven goals. As a result, he was recalled by the Lions – though it appeared difficult for him to grab a place in the starting team, because of the presence of players with much more experience such as Ânderson Polga, Tonel, Marco Caneira or Custódio – and ended up playing 23 Primeira Liga matches during the campaign as his team finished second. He was equally impressive in his debut in the UEFA Champions League, a 1–0 home win against Inter Milan where he stopped Patrick Vieira and Luís Figo from playing effectively, earning Player of the match accolades in the process.

In 2007–08, Veloso was ever-present in Sporting's central midfield alongside fellow youth graduate João Moutinho. The club again lost the league to FC Porto, and the same befell in the following season, with the player being involved in some run-ins with manager Paulo Bento. In the previous off-season and the following January transfer window, he attracted interest from several Premier League sides, but nothing materialised.

Veloso helped Sporting reach the last 16 in the 2009–10 UEFA Europa League, after scoring in both legs of the 4–2 aggregate victory over Everton. They could only, however, finish fourth in the domestic league.

Italy and Dynamo Kyiv
On 30 July 2010, Veloso was sold to Genoa C.F.C. in Italy. On 4 July 2012 he moved teams and countries again, signing a four-year contract with FC Dynamo Kyiv of the Ukrainian Premier League.

On 31 July 2016, after 127 games in all competitions (14 goals) and four major titles, including the double in the 2014–15 campaign, 30-year-old Veloso returned to Genoa. He left the Stadio Luigi Ferraris two years later, but returned shortly after agreeing to a new deal.

Veloso signed a one-year contract with Hellas Verona F.C. on 20 July 2019. He scored a free kick on his debut on 25 August, equalising in a 1–1 home draw with Bologna F.C. 1909.

International career

Veloso acted as captain for Portugal at the 2003 UEFA European Under-17 Championship, helping the nation emerge victorious on home soil after defeating Spain 2–1 in an Iberian final played in Viseu. He was elected the tournament's Golden Player, and subsequently also helped the team reach the quarter-finals in that year's FIFA World Cup held in Finland.

On 14 August 2007, following impressive performances for the under-21s in the 2007 UEFA European Championship in June (the skipper scored twice in three games, albeit in a group stage exit), Veloso was called up to the full side for the first time, for a Euro 2008 qualifier against Armenia, but only made his international debut against Azerbaijan on 13 October. In the finals' group stage, he appeared in the 0–2 loss against Switzerland, a game in which nine out of 11 regular starters were rested.

Veloso was recalled by coach Carlos Queiroz after a long spell out of the squad, for vital 2010 FIFA World Cup qualifying matches with Denmark and Hungary in September 2009, but did not leave the bench on either occasion; he did take the field when they met the latter again the following month, winning 3–0. He netted his first international goal in the same competition, in a 4–0 victory over Malta in Guimarães on 14 October.

On 15 November 2011, Veloso scored from a free kick as Portugal defeated Bosnia and Herzegovina 6–2 at the Estádio da Luz in a play-off for a place at Euro 2012. He played every minute of their finals campaign in Poland and Ukraine, before being substituted at half-time in extra time of an eventual penalty shootout loss to Spain in the semi-finals.

In September 2015, after one year in the international wilderness, Veloso was picked by manager Fernando Santos for a friendly with France and a Euro 2016 qualifier against Albania. In the second game, on the 7th, he headed home after a 92nd-minute corner kick for the only goal.

Personal life
Veloso's father, António, was also a footballer. A defender, he played several years with Benfica, and was also a longtime Portuguese international.

In 2013, Veloso married the daughter of Genoa club president Enrico Preziosi, Paola.

Career statistics

Club

International

Scores and results list Portugal's goal tally first.

|}

Honours
Olivais e Moscavide
Segunda Divisão: 2005–06

Sporting CP
Taça de Portugal: 2006–07, 2007–08
Supertaça Cândido de Oliveira: 2007, 2008
Taça da Liga runner-up: 2007–08, 2008–09

Dynamo Kyiv
Ukrainian Premier League: 2014–15, 2015–16
Ukrainian Cup: 2013–14, 2014–15
Ukrainian Super Cup runner-up: 2014, 2015

Portugal U17
UEFA European Under-17 Championship: 2003

Individual
UEFA European Under-17 Championship Golden Player Award: 2003
Primeira Liga Breakthrough Player of the Year: 2006–07
UEFA European Under-21 Championship Team of the Tournament: 2007

References

External links

1986 births
Living people
Sportspeople from Coimbra
Portuguese footballers
Association football midfielders
Association football utility players
Primeira Liga players
Segunda Divisão players
Sporting CP footballers
C.D. Olivais e Moscavide players
Serie A players
Genoa C.F.C. players
Hellas Verona F.C. players
Ukrainian Premier League players
FC Dynamo Kyiv players
Portugal youth international footballers
Portugal under-21 international footballers
Portugal international footballers
UEFA Euro 2008 players
2010 FIFA World Cup players
UEFA Euro 2012 players
2014 FIFA World Cup players
Portuguese expatriate footballers
Expatriate footballers in Italy
Expatriate footballers in Ukraine
Portuguese expatriate sportspeople in Italy
Portuguese expatriate sportspeople in Ukraine